Henry Topping (27 October 1908 – January 1977) was an English footballer who played as a full-back. Born in Manchester, he started his career at United Glassblowers and later played for Horwich Railway Mechanics Institute, Manchester United, Barnsley, Macclesfield and Wigan Athletic.

References

External links
Manchester United career details
MUFCInfo.com profile

1908 births
Footballers from Manchester
1977 deaths
English footballers
Association football fullbacks
Leigh Genesis F.C. players
Manchester United F.C. players
Macclesfield Town F.C. players
Manchester North End F.C. players
Barnsley F.C. players
Wigan Athletic F.C. players